Tarusa is a river in western Russian Kaluga Oblast.

References

Rivers of Kaluga Oblast